Psalm 66 is the 66th psalm of the Book of Psalms, beginning in English in the King James Version: "Make a joyful noise unto God, all ye lands". In the slightly different numbering system of the Greek Septuagint version of the Bible and the Latin Vulgate, this psalm is Psalm 65. In Latin, it is known as "Iubilate Deo omnis terra". It is a psalm of thanksgiving probably intended for use at the Passover. The psalm is divided into two parts: in verses 1-12 the community praises God and invites the whole world to join in praise; in verses 13–20, "an individual from the rescued community fulfils a vow to offer a sacrifice of thanksgiving".

The psalm forms a regular part of Jewish, Catholic, Lutheran, Anglican and other Protestant liturgies. It has been set to music.

Text

King James Version 

 Make a joyful noise unto God, all ye lands:
 Sing forth the honour of his name: make his praise glorious.
 Say unto God, How terrible art thou in thy works! through the greatness of thy power shall thine enemies submit themselves unto thee.
 All the earth shall worship thee, and shall sing unto thee; they shall sing to thy name. Selah.
 Come and see the works of God: he is terrible in his doing toward the children of men.
 He turned the sea into dry land: they went through the flood on foot: there did we rejoice in him.
 He ruleth by his power for ever; his eyes behold the nations: let not the rebellious exalt themselves. Selah.
 O bless our God, ye people, and make the voice of his praise to be heard:
 Which holdeth our soul in life, and suffereth not our feet to be moved.
 For thou, O God, hast proved us: thou hast tried us, as silver is tried.
 Thou broughtest us into the net; thou laidst affliction upon our loins.
 Thou hast caused men to ride over our heads; we went through fire and through water: but thou broughtest us out into a wealthy place.
 I will go into thy house with burnt offerings: I will pay thee my vows,
 Which my lips have uttered, and my mouth hath spoken, when I was in trouble.
 I will offer unto thee burnt sacrifices of fatlings, with the incense of rams; I will offer bullocks with goats. Selah.
 Come and hear, all ye that fear God, and I will declare what he hath done for my soul.
 I cried unto him with my mouth, and he was extolled with my tongue.
 If I regard iniquity in my heart, the Lord will not hear me:
 But verily God hath heard me; he hath attended to the voice of my prayer.
 Blessed be God, which hath not turned away my prayer, nor his mercy from me.

Uses

Judaism 
Verse 9 is part of the paragraph Ve'emunah Kal Zot that is recited following the Shema.
It is recited on the second day of Sukkot in some traditions, on the second day of Passover in some traditions and the sixth day in others.

Book of Common Prayer 
In the Church of England's Book of Common Prayer, this psalm is appointed to be read on the evening of the 12th day of the month.

History 
[Come and see] "what God hath wrought"  was the first message sent by telegraph in 1844. The verse was suggested by Annie Ellsworth and inspired by Psalm 66:5 and Psalm 66:16. Standing in the chamber of the Supreme Court, Samuel B. Morse sent a 19-letter message to his assistant Albert Vail in Baltimore, who transmitted the message back. Psalm 66:5 was sent as "come and see what God has done" while Psalm 66:16 was the reply: "Come and see what God has done for me".

Music 
Heinrich Schütz set Psalm 66 in a metred version in German, "Jauchzet Gott, alle Lande sehr", SWV 163, as part of the Becker Psalter, first published in 1628.

References

External links 

 
 
  in Hebrew and English - Mechon-mamre
 Text of Psalm 66 according to the 1928 Psalter
 For the leader. A song; a psalm. Shout joyfully to God, all the earth; sing of his glorious name text and footnotes, usccb.org United States Conference of Catholic Bishops
 Psalm 66 – How Everyone Can Praise God text and detailed commentary, enduringword.com
 Psalm 66:1 introduction and text, biblestudytools.com
 Psalm 66 / Refrain: All the earth shall worship you, O Lord. Church of England
 Psalm 66 at biblegateway.com
 Hymns for Psalm 66 hymnary.org
 Psalm 66 in the Revised Grail Psalter

066